The Black Stork, also known as Are You Fit To Marry?, is a 1917 American motion picture film both written by and starring Harry J. Haiselden, who was the chief surgeon at the German-American Hospital in Chicago. The Black Stork is Haiselden's fictionalized account of his eugenic infanticide of John Bollinger, who was born with severe disabilities. The film depicts Haiselden's fictionalized story of a woman who has a nightmare of a severely disabled child being a menace to society. Once awoken from the nightmare, she visits a doctor and realizes all was fine with her child. However, the purpose of the film was not to have a happy ending and move on. The purpose was to basically warn people, especially teenagers, of the dangers of sexual promiscuity and "race mixing", as these actions were believed to be the cause of disabilities in children.

Haiselden's film garnered many mixed reviews, and his actions were very controversial at the time. At this point in history, when the word "disability" was brought up, all anyone thought of was a "disease" that could be spread. Through this way of thinking, a majority of people agreed with Haiselden's actions and enforced the idea that doctors have the right to decide whether a disabled child should live. However, there was also a number of people who protested Dr. Heiselden's actions, including the Roman Catholic Church. Despite the public backlash, The Black Stork was still shown commercially in movie theaters for two years. After 1918, the movie was renamed Are You Fit To Marry? and remained in theaters and traveling road shows for many more years, as late as 1942.

Dr. Haiselden 
Harry J. Haiselden was born on March 16, 1870, to George W. Haiselden and Elizabeth Dickey. Throughout his life, he expressed a passion for the medical field and ended up graduating from the University of Illinois medical school, and later accepted a job at the German-American Hospital in Chicago. During his time working at the hospital, he experienced many different instances of children growing up with disabilities, which led to his reasoning behind letting children with severe disabilities die. He experienced first hand the toll it took on both the child and family, and chose to promote infanticide rather than letting the disabled children live their lives with excessive treatments and painful procedures.

The Bollinger case

On November 17, 1915, John Bollinger was born to a woman named Anna Bollinger. He was born with no neck or right ear, as well as a severe skin ailment, all determined to be the cause of syphilis passed on from the father. After treating children with disabilities for many years at the American-German Hospital, he saw the severity of John Bollinger's condition and took it upon himself to advise Anna that the quality of life for her son will only get worse as he grows up. He confided in her that he has the skill set to surgically repair his defects and save the child's life, however he has experience with similar cases and convinced her that it was in the best interest for John to just let him die naturally. Out of fear for her son's future quality of life, the mother ultimately decided to follow Haiselden's advice and agreed that the best course of action is infanticide, instead of allowing him to grow up and deal with the disabilities in his adult years. As the child was dying though, an unknown person attempted to kidnap John Bollinger in an attempt to save his life and take him to another hospital for treatment, but her efforts were futile and ended unsuccessfully.

While the Catholic church was in full protest against Dr. Haiselden's actions, activists Helen Keller and Woodrow Wilson, as well as attorney Clarence Darrow and many others each wrote separate articles in support of Dr. Haiselden's choice. Dr. Haiselden was an outspoken supporter of the eugenics movement prior to the case and, after the publicity made him famous, he took eugenics onto the national stage. He was taken to court following a public release of information, and was ultimately acquitted by a jury for allowing John Bollinger to die. The Illinois Board of Health attempted to revoke Haiselden's medical license but that action was dropped.  Even through these protests, he still managed to preserve his title and keep his medical license. During the trial, a coroner's jury determined that the child was not syphilitic, but in fact brain damaged and therefore defective. This brain damage gave Haiselden's actions even more validity and praise. Still, the Chicago Medical Society expelled Haiselden from their membership for The Black Stork film and the publicity that he sought out after the infanticide.

Film 
The film revolves around a fictional Dr. Dickey, played by and based on Haiselden himself, who is called in to operate in order to save the life of a "defective" child. Dr. Dickey refuses to operate on the child, as he is seen shooing his apron away from the nurse. Other doctors save the child and he grows up as a shunned monstrosity. He later returns to kill the doctor who "condemned [him] to life." The mother then wakes up from her nightmare and realizes that she and her fiancé need to get tested to ensure that they will have "fit" offspring. They pass the exam and have a happy and healthy child. The film concludes with Congress passing mandatory premarital testing legislation in order to prevent defective children. Images of disabled individuals are inter-played throughout the film. The film served two main purposes. Younger children were not allowed into theaters while this movie was playing, but teenagers were. Teenagers were allowed to watch this movie as a warning, showing the dangers of sexual promiscuity and "race mixing". Sex at a young age that results in pregnancy could cause serious defects to the child, as well as the worry of spreading syphilis. The film also showed adults what life would be like if a disabled child was allowed to grow up and live among the rest of society, and basically seed the idea in their minds that if they were to have a child with a "defect", it would be better for everyone just to let it naturally die instead of treating the disability.

Public perceptions 

The reviews for Haiselden's film were mixed. Rarely did people directly criticize his message but rather they attacked his egotism and his poor production values. Many were in favor and agreed with Haiselden's actions, stating that doctors are knowledgeable enough to make these decisions. At this point in time, the majority public opinion was that disabled children were "degenerates", and many were worried that disabled children could spread disabilities like a disease. Many also compared this situation to how we treat disabled animals. Sick dogs beyond treatment are euthanized, and many people used this idea as justification, stating we should do the same to children with disabilities beyond repair. Lastly, many parents with fully grown disabled children also came forward, stating that while it may be sad, it would have been better for their children to have not dealt with all the hospital visits and the constant worrying about health.

Alternatively, a number of people disagreed with Haiselden's actions, using religion as a basis of their protests. Many civilians argued that God should be the only one in charge of deciding who lives and who dies. With this mindset, an average man should not have the power or ego to make these decisions. Many also cited the Fifth Amendment, which states "No One can be deprived of life, liberty, and property without due process of law". Others justified their protest on the fact that the main purpose of a doctor should be to heal patients and make sure they live as long as they can, not the opposite.

The movie itself was not received well in the media, with critics stating that it was "sickening and disturbing" to record a child in this way. While audience members were split on how to perceive this, the media was set on being against anything that dealt with this movie and with Dr. Haiselden, condemning him in the press.

References

External links
 

1917 films
Eugenics in fiction
American black-and-white films
American silent feature films
Silent American drama films
1917 drama films
1910s American films